Çağlayan may refer to:

People
 Çağlayan (surname)

Places
In Turkey
 Çağlayan, Alaşehir
 Çağlayan, Çanakçı
 Çağlayan, Çivril
 Çağlayan, Erzincan
 Çağlayan, Fındıklı
 Çağlayan, Gerze
 Çağlayan, Giresun
 Çağlayan, Kağıthane (which hosts the Istanbul Justice Palace)
 Çağlayan, Kalkandere
 Çağlayan, Kars
 Çağlayan, Kulp
 Çağlayan, Ödemiş
 Çağlayan, Pülümür
 Çağlayan, Şebinkarahisar
 Çağlayan, Şişli
 Çağlayan, Ulubey

In Cyprus
 Çağlayan, Nicosia